A virtual friend may be

 A pseudonym (or alias)
 A non-player character who acts a friend/companion/partner to the player's character
 Virtual pet
 An imaginary friend
 A friend you met and communicate with online, in an internet relationship
 A friend class or function that is virtual in programming
 A song from Armin van Buuren's album Mirage (2011)

See also
 Friend
 Virtuality